The 2002–03 UCLA Bruins men's basketball team represented the University of California, Los Angeles in the 2002–03 NCAA Division I men's basketball season.  The team finished 8th in the conference and lost in the second round of the Pac-10 tournament to the Oregon Ducks.  The Bruins did not play in a post-season tournament.  This was the final season for head coach Steve Lavin.  This season was also notable as it was UCLA's first losing season since the 1947–48 season. The Bruins 54 years of consecutive winning seasons had set an NCAA record. Coach Steve Lavin was fired at the season’s end.

Roster

Schedule

|-
!colspan=9 style=|Exhibition

|-
!colspan=9 style=|Regular Season

|-
!colspan=9 style=| Pac-10 Tournament

Source

Notes
 In the first round of the Pac-10 Tournament, UCLA beat Arizona who was then ranked #1 in the nation (AP poll). The Bruins had defeated a #1 team, four years in a row (along with the victory of #1 Kansas in the previous season and #1 Stanford the two years before that). 
 In spite of the losing season UCLA beat two AP Top-20 teams in 2002–03 (the other being #18 Cal). UCLA's losing season was the first in 55 years, snapping an NCAA record of consecutive winning seasons.
 The 6 wins in regular season conference play was also the lowest since the 1952–53 season (when UCLA went 6-6).
 ASU swept UCLA for the first time in 23 years (1979-80 season) and for only the second time since they joined the Pac-8.

References

Ucla
UCLA Bruins men's basketball seasons
NCAA
NCAA